Gemla is a locality situated in Växjö Municipality, Kronoberg County, Sweden with 1,342 inhabitants in 2010. Gemla is known for the late poet and writer, Pär Lagerkvist, whose childhood memories of Gemla are vividly described in the novel autobiography  (Translates to "Guest of the reality").

The cyclist Gustav Larsson, who won a silver medal in the Olympics, comes from Gemla.

References 

Populated places in Kronoberg County
Populated places in Växjö Municipality